Pyrausta amboinalis is a moth in the family Crambidae. It was described by Pagenstecher in 1884. It is found on Ambon Island.

References

Moths described in 1884
amboinalis
Moths of Indonesia